Odontodes  is a genus of moths of the family Noctuidae.

Description
Antennae very long and slender. Palpi slender and upturned, where the second joint reaching vertex of head and third joint short. Thorax smoothly scaled. Abdomen with a tuft on first segment. Forewings slightly arched towards rectangular apex. Outer angle slightly hooked and slight tufts of raised scales present.

References

Stictopterinae